Chengdu Tianfu Art Museum is a contemporary art museum in Chengdu, Sichuan, China.

Overview
The museum is located within the Tianfu Art Park in the Jinniu District of Chengdu. It opened in the park, along with the new Chengdu Museum of Contemporary Art, at the time of the 2021 Chengdu Biennale, which was held in these two museums, organized by the Chengdu Art Academy. The museum is intended to focus on local art in Chengdu. The roof shape of the building is in the form of hibiscus petals, the city flower of Chengdu.

See also
 Chengdu Art Academy
 Chengdu Biennale
 Chengdu Museum of Contemporary Art
 Tianfu Art Park

Gallery

References

External links
 

2021 establishments in China
Museums established in 2021
Buildings and structures completed in 2021
Museums in Chengdu
Art museums and galleries in China
Arts in Chengdu